The Kosovo Raid of 1448, was a military campaign launched by Albanian commander Gjergj Kastrioti Skanderbeg against the Despotate of Serbia. The Raid was a response to Đurađ Branković, who had prevented him to join the Army of John Hunyadi, who was leading a Crusade against the Ottomans, and had clashed with Murad II on the Kosovo field. However, Brankovic's exact role is disputed.

Background 
During the Albanian–Venetian War, Skanderbeg agreed to sign the peace treaty with Venice. The reasons for that, was the advance of John Hunyadi's army in Kosovo and his invitation for Skanderbeg to join the expedition against the sultan. However, the Albanian army under Skanderbeg did not participate in this battle as he was prevented from joining with Hunyadi's army. He was delayed by Đurađ Branković, then allied with Sultan Murad II, whose army occupied the mountain passes on the Serbian-Albanian border. Nevertheless, Skanderbeg took another route and marched to join Hunyadi, and is said to have been only 20 miles from Kosovo Polje, but Hunyadi decided not to wait for Skanderbeg and his reinforcements to open the battle, and was ultimately defeated, when the Hungarian army finally broke.

Raid 
Little is known about the actual raid or the aftermath of it. Skanderbeg was possibly eager for revenge after being delayed. As a result of this he let his armies raid into Kosovo to punish Branković. He then returned to Krujë towards the end of November.

References 

Warfare by Skanderbeg
Kosovo Raid
Kosovo Raid
Kosovo Raid
Kosovo Raid